Senran Kagura: Bon Appétit! is a cooking themed rhythm game spinoff in the Senran Kagura series. The game was released on the PlayStation Store on November 11, 2014 for North America, and on November 12, 2014 for Europe. An enhanced version for Microsoft Windows titled Senran Kagura: Bon Appétit! - Full Course was released on November 10, 2016.

Gameplay
Tapping along with the music can create combos, and the more combos the better the food created in the game is. The game consists of 10 levels, equating to 10 dishes that must be created. Every other level reveals more of the player's shinobi character's story. All of the character and costume DLC from Senran Kagura Shinovi Versus is compatible with Senran Kagura: Bon Appétit!.

Plot
In the game, Master Hanzo convinces the shinobi warriors of Senran Kagura to cook for him by holding a cooking competition, with first prize being a Secret Ninja Art Scroll which grants one wish.

Development
Downloadable content (DLC), the "Gessen x Hebijo DLC pack", is available. It provides extra levels (dishes to create) and a free soundtrack app that features songs from the game.

Reception

Senran Kagura: Bon Appétit! received "mixed or average" reviews according to review aggregator Metacritic.

References

2014 video games
Cooking video games
PlayStation Vita games
Windows games
Single-player video games
Senran Kagura
Xseed Games games